The 1994 United States motorcycle Grand Prix was the twelfth round of the 1994 Grand Prix motorcycle racing season. It took place on September 11, 1994, at the Laguna Seca Raceway. This round was the last motorcycle Grand Prix hosted by the United States until 2005.

500 cc classification

250 cc classification

125 cc classification

References

United States motorcycle Grand Prix
United States
United States Grand Prix
United States Motorcycle Grand Prix
United States Motorcycle Grand Prix